The giant kelpfish (Heterostichus rostratus) is a species of clinid native to the west coast of North America, where it is found from California to southern Baja California. It inhabits rocky areas with kelp and other large seaweeds. Its diet consists of small crustaceans, mollusks, and fishes. It can also be found in the aquarium trade. It is currently the only known member of its genus.

References 

giant kelpfish
Western North American coastal fauna

giant kelpfish